Sir Thomas Lawrence, 3rd Baronet ( – 1714) was the 2nd Royal Governor of Maryland in 1693, elected by the Governor's Council following the death of Sir Lionel Copley, (1648-1693). He governed the colony for only a few weeks before the new royally appointed governor, Edmund Andros, (1637-1714), arrived from his trans-Atlantic trip to take over control of the colony. He was briefly the 6th Royal Governor of Maryland a second time when Andros then left the colony in 1694 (later also served as governor in the Dominion of New England and Virginia). Lawrence's successor was Francis Nicholson.

Early life
Thomas Lawrence was born in 1645 in Chelsea, Middlesex, England. He was the eldest son of Sir John Lawrence, 2nd Baronet and Mary Hempson. He emigrated in 1692 in Province of Maryland, settling in Mary's City (St. Mary's County) and Annapolis, while his family probably stayed in England.

Career
In 1693 he was President of the Council and acting Royal Governor of Province of Maryland. He governed Maryland for a few weeks and was replaced by Edmund Andros. Lawrence returned to England in 1705/6.

Death
Lawrence died on April 25, 1714, in London. At his death, the baronetcy became extinct.

References 

Baronets in the Baronetage of England
Colonial Governors of Maryland
1714 deaths
1645 births
English emigrants